Schefflera winkleri is a species of flowering plant in the family Araliaceae. It is endemic to Borneo.

References 

winkleri
Endemic flora of Borneo